Flip or Flop Nashville is a television series airing on HGTV hosted by real estate agents DeRon Jenkins and Page Turner. It is a spin-off of the HGTV series Flip or Flop. It premiered on January 18, 2018 and is set in Nashville, Tennessee.

Premise
On March 1, 2017, HGTV announced "Flip or Flop" will expand to Nashville, Tennessee. The shows will feature a new couple, DeRon Jenkins and Page Turner, flipping houses in Nashville, Tennessee. DeRon Jenkins and Page Turner will have the same roles as Tarek and Christina in this show.

Hosts
DeRon Jenkins is a licensed contractor and Page Turner is a seasoned real estate agent. They find the worst properties in Nashville and transform them into stylish and functional family homes. During the opening of the show they introduce themselves as exes and say that although they didn't ‘work together’ (as a married couple), they still work together.

Episodes

Season 1

Season 2

References

External links
 
 Episode Guide

Flip or Flop (franchise)
2018 American television series debuts
2010s American reality television series
Television shows set in Tennessee
Nashville, Tennessee
American television spin-offs
Reality television spin-offs